Orculella critica is a species of air-breathing land snail, a terrestrial pulmonate gastropod mollusc in the family Orculidae.

Geographic distribution
O. critica is native to Greece, where it is found in various areas of the mainland and several islands in the Aegean Sea, and Turkey, where it occurs in the country's western coast.

See also
List of non-marine molluscs of Greece
List of non-marine molluscs of Turkey

References 

Orculidae
Molluscs of Europe
Fauna of Turkey
Gastropods described in 1856